Homer Brown Hobbs (February 13, 1923 – January 5, 1997) was an American football player and coach.  He played professionally as a guard for the San Francisco 49ers of the All-America Football Conference (AAFC) and National Football League (NFL).  He played college football as a lineman at the University of Georgia, lettering in 1946, 1947 and 1948, and was drafted in the 11th round of the 1949 NFL Draft by the Washington Redskins with the 108th pick overall.  In 1951, he joined Ralph Jordan's staff as a line coach at Auburn University.  On January 28, 1952 Hobbs resigned from Auburn to accept an assistant coaching position at the United States Naval Academy, rejoining Eddie Erdelatz, who was his 49ers line coach.  From 1955 to 1957 Hobbs was head football coach at Furman University.  He was succeeded at Furman by Bob King for the 1958 season.

Head coaching record

References

External links
 

1923 births
1997 deaths
American football offensive guards
Auburn Tigers football coaches
Furman Paladins athletic directors
Furman Paladins football coaches
Georgia Bulldogs football players
Navy Midshipmen football coaches
San Francisco 49ers (AAFC) players
San Francisco 49ers players
People from Lexington, South Carolina
Players of American football from South Carolina